Arce may refer to:

Places
Arce, Lazio, a municipality in the province of Frosinone, in the region of Lazio, Italy
Arce, Spain, a municipality of autonomous community of Navarre, Spain
Ciudad Arce, El Salvador
Rocca d'Arce, Italy

Other
Arce (surname)
Arce, a tortrix moth genus nowadays considered a junior synonym of Phtheochroa
arce, the Spanish word for maple
Arce Stream, a tributary of the Né River (in turn the Charente River) in France
Arke (mythology), a goddess in Greek mythology

See also
Acer (disambiguation)
Arcee
Arse (disambiguation)